Korshavn is a fishing village in Hvaler, Østfold, Norway.

Villages in Østfold